Wyanet Township is one of twenty-five townships in Bureau County, Illinois, USA. As of the 2020 census, its population was 1,245 and it contained 567 housing units. Wyanet Township changed its name from Centre Township on an unknown date.

Geography

Villages
 Wyanet

Cemeteries

 Aldrich Family
 County Home
 Forest Hill
 Sapp
 Triplett

Major highways
  Interstate 80
  US Route 6

Airports and landing strips
 Eckberg Airport

Demographics
As of the 2020 census there were 1,245 people, 549 households, and 374 families residing in the township. The racial makeup of the township was 92.85% White, 0.32% African American, 0.56% Native American, 0.48% Asian, 0.00% Pacific Islander, 0.24% from other races, and 5.54% from two or more races. Hispanic or Latino of any race were 3.45% of the population.

There were 549 households, out of which 39.00% had children under the age of 18 living with them, 54.10% were married couples living together, 10.93% had a female householder with no spouse present, and 31.88% were non-families. 25.10% of all households were made up of individuals, and 14.90% had someone living alone who was 65 years of age or older. The average household size was 2.59 and the average family size was 3.04.

The township's age distribution consisted of 28.9% under the age of 18, 5.9% from 18 to 24, 27.1% from 25 to 44, 23.1% from 45 to 64, and 14.9% who were 65 years of age or older. The median age was 39.1 years. For every 100 females, there were 94.8 males. For every 100 females age 18 and over, there were 91.1 males.

The median income for a household in the township was $48,036, and the median income for a family was $58,571. Males had a median income of $43,313 versus $25,438 for females. The per capita income for the township was $23,870. About 13.6% of families and 17.6% of the population were below the poverty line, including 26.7% of those under age 18 and 5.7% of those age 65 or over.

School districts
 Bureau Valley Community Unit School District 340

Political districts
 Illinois's 11th congressional district
 State House District 73
 State House District 74
 State Senate District 37

References
 
 US Census Bureau 2007 TIGER/Line Shapefiles
 US National Atlas

External links
 City-Data.com
 Illinois State Archives

Townships in Bureau County, Illinois
Populated places established in 1849
Townships in Illinois
1849 establishments in Illinois